The Istana Darussalam (English: Darussalam Palace) is the former residence of Omar Ali Saifuddien III and birthplace of Sultan of Brunei, Hassanal Bolkiah. The palace is located at Jalan Darussalam, Sumbiling Lama, Brunei-Muara District, Brunei. The building has become a tourist attraction and currently under the protection of the Antiquities and Treasure Trove Act of the Museums Department.

Design and construction
Istana Darussalam is located on the banks of the Kedayan River, is an illustration of the finest indigenous Malay structure of the time. It was first constructed from wood in 1947, and later, concrete was used to replace certain wooden pillars and beams. The structure is green and brown and has a distinctive Malay home architecture. The royal structure still stands in stunning contrast to the neighborhood's collection of village homes.

History
The palace began construction in the 1940s. Several national festivities have taken place at this palace, including notably when Sultan Hassanal Bolkiah was born there on 15 July 1946. In 1947, the lower part of the building was used as a private office by then Sultan Omar Ali. The Royal family no longer uses the building, although every Friday, representatives of the Omar Ali Saifuddien Mosque hold the tahlil ritual there. When the Royal family relocated from Istana Darussalam to Istana Darul Hana in 1951, Omar Ali's guests were temporarily housed there while he attended Malay College in Malaysia.

On 7 September 1986, Omar Ali passed away at the palace and later buried at Kubah Makam Di Raja. The Public Works Department of the Ministry of Development currently maintains the palace, including several others with significant historical and cultural value.

See also
 Politics of Brunei
 Bandar Seri Begawan
 Istana Nurul Iman

References

External links

Government of Brunei

Darussalam
Darussalam
Official residences in Brunei
Buildings and structures in Bandar Seri Begawan
Historic sites in Brunei